The Kazakh National Academy of Arts (abbr. KazNAA) is the main theatre, film, drama, and fine arts and design school in Almaty, Kazakhstan. The Academy (T. Q. Jürgenov atyndağy Qazaq ūlttyq öner akademiasy) began as the theatrical faculty of the Kurmangazy Institute of Arts, known today as the Kazakh National Conservatory, in 1955. It was named after Temirbek Zhurgenov (1898-1939) in 1989.

At the Academy of Arts. T.K. Zhurgenova runs a student television studio, which is an important educational platform for developing students' creativity and demonstrating the result of their work in public.

The Academy carries out work on the international educational programs Erasmus +, Mevlana, DAAD.

History 

The history of the Academy goes back to 1955, when the People's Artist of the Kazakh SSR A.T. Tokpanov opened the Theater Department at the Kurmangazy State Conservatory of Alma-Ata. In 1977 Alma-Ata theatrical art institute was established on its basis. In 1978 the first admission of students to the theatrical and art faculties was realized.

In the 1982-1983 academic year, the institute had 490 students, 95 teachers, including 5 professors and doctors of sciences, 7 associate professors and candidates of sciences.

On January 28, 1989 the institute was named after the first People's Commissar of Education of Kazakhstan, who made a great contribution to the development of national culture and art, Temirbek Karayevich Zhurgenov.

In 1993 the university was reorganized into Kazakh State Institute of Theatre and Cinema named after T.K.Zhurgenov and the Faculty of Cinema and TV was organized. On June 22, 1994 the Higher school of choreography at KazGITC named after T.K.Zhurgenov was founded, which was subsequently transformed to the faculty of choreography.

In 2000, through the merger of the Kazakh State Institute of Theater and Cinema named after T.K. Zhurgenov and the Kazakh State Academy of Art, the Kazakh State Academy of Arts named after T.K. Zhurgenov was established.

On July 5, 2001 by the Decree of the President of the Republic of Kazakhstan the Academy was given a special status of a national university. The main academic building of the Academy is located in the former building of the Sovnarkom of the Kazakh SSR, architect M.Y. Ginzburg (1927-1930).

Faculties 

 Theater arts
 Musical art
 Choreography
 Film, TV, and Art History
 Variety Art
 Painting, Sculpture, Design and Applied Art

Student telestudio 
The Academy of Arts named after T.K. Zhurgenov has a student television studio, which is an important educational platform to develop students' abilities to create and demonstrate the result of their work publicly.

Rectors 

 1975-1985 - G.A. Dzhanysbaeva.
 1987-1989 - Aman Kulbayev
 1989-1991 - Ashirbek Sygay
 1991-1994 - Esmukhan Obayev
 1994-2000 - Ibragimov U.Sh.
 2000-2008 - Kishkashbaev T.A.
 2008-2014 - Arystanbek Mukhamediuly
 2014-2018 - Bibigul Nusipzhanova
 2018-2019 - Askhat Maemirov
 2019-2021 - Akan Abdualiev
 June 18, 2021 to February 14, 2022 - Sharipbek Amirbek
 February 14, 2022 - Satybaldy, Azamat

Academy building 
After the transfer of the capital of the Kazakh SSR from Kyzylorda to Alma-Ata, it became necessary to build a new administrative center for state institutions. Therefore, the construction of a building for the Government of the Kazakh SSR (modern address - 136 Bogenbai Batyr Street) was carried out in 1927-1931. The authors of the project were M. Ginzburg and F. Milinis, the engineer was V. Orlovsky. The design of the building won the All-Union competition of the Moscow Architectural Society.

The building was occupied by the famous Soviet figure L.I. Mirzoyan, the First Central Committee of the Communist Party (Bolsheviks) of Kazakhstan.

In 1941 the building was reconstructed by architects B. Dergachev, G. Kushnarenko and engineer N. Orazmybetov, as a result of which the wings were completed and the roof was replaced.

After the construction of a new government building in 1958, the structure was transferred to the Kazakh State University named after S. M. Kirov. During this period, there was a monument to Kirov in the vestibule of the academic building.

In 1982, the building housed the Theatre and Art Institute, which later got a new name - Almaty Institute of Theatre and Cinema named after Zhurgenov. Zhurgenov Almaty Institute of Theater and Cinematography.

The building currently houses the Zhurgenov Kazakh National Academy of Arts.

Reference list

Buildings and structures in Almaty
Universities in Kazakhstan